Marie Majerová (1 February 1882 – 16 January 1967) was a Czech writer and translator.

Biography
The daughter of working-class parents, she was born in Úvaly and grew up in Kladno. When she was sixteen, she began working as a servant in Budapest. She went on to complete her education in Prague, Paris and Vienna. She was a member of the Czechoslovak Communist Party from its inception and was also involved in the feminist movement.

In 1907, she published a collection of stories Povídky z pekla a jiné (Stories from Hell and other stories) and a novel Panenství (Maidenhood). Her writing concerns itself with the oppression of the working class and of women. She also wrote literature for children.

Majerová was married twice: first to the journalist Josef Stivín and then to the graphic artist Slavoboj Tusar.

She died in Prague at the age of 84.

The 1937 film Virginity, directed by Otakar Vávra, was based on her novel Panenství. Her novel Siréna was the basis for the screenplay for the 1947 film of the same name with English title The Strike, directed by Karel Steklý. The 1947 film received a Golden Lion at the Venice Film Festival.

Czech-Canadian author Josef Škvorecký has said that his character Marie Burdychova in The Miracle Game was physically based on Marie Majerová.

Selected works 
 Náměstí republiky (Republic square). novel (1914)
 Nejkrásnější svět (The most beautiful of worlds), novel (1920)
 Mučenky (Passionflowers), short stories (1924)
 Přehrada (The Farmer), novel (1932)
 Siréna (The Siren), novel (1935)
 Havířská balada (Ballad of a miner) (1938)
 Spisy, collected works in 19 volumes (1962)

References

External links 
 

1882 births
1967 deaths
People from Úvaly
People from the Kingdom of Bohemia
Czech Social Democratic Party politicians
Communist Party of Czechoslovakia politicians
Czech communists
Czech feminists
Czech novelists
Czech women novelists
Czech women short story writers
Czech short story writers
Communist writers
Socialist feminists
20th-century novelists
20th-century women writers
20th-century short story writers
Burials at Olšany Cemetery